Robert Yeo (born Robert Yeo Cheng Chuan; 1940) is a Singaporean poet, playwright and novelist.

Career
Yeo is a retired lecturer of the National Institute of Education and Nanyang Technological University. In 2011, he is a teacher of creative writing at the Singapore Management University and mentors the Mentor Access Programme of the National Arts Council. In 1978, he attended the University of Iowa's International Writing Program and was a Fulbright Scholar in 1995. For more than a decade, from 1977 onwards, he was chairman of the Drama Advisory Committee which helped develop theatre in Singapore, especially English-language theatre. For this work, he received the Bintang Bakti Masyarakat (Public Service Star) in 1991, and was awarded the S.E.A. Write Award in 2011.

He has published four poetry collections: Coming Home Baby (1971); And Napalm Does Not Help (1977), A Part of Three (1989) and Leaving Home, Mother (1999) and has been included in several anthologies, including Five Takes (1974).

His venture into novel writing resulted in a sole book: The Adventures of Holden Heng (1986) about the sexual education of its anti-hero.

Yeo has written six plays: Are You There, Singapore? (1974), One Year Back Home (1980), Second Chance (1988), The Eye of History (1991), Changi (1996) and Your Bed is Your Coffin. All the plays except the last have been staged in Singapore. Are You There, Singapore?, One Year Back Home and Changi are collectively known as "the Singapore trilogy".

Yeo has also edited collections of short fiction, plays and textbooks, a memoir, as well as the libretto for an opera, Fences (2012).

Works

Poetry collections
Coming Home Baby (1971, Federal Publications)
And Napalm Does Not Help (1977, Heinemann Educational Books (Asia))
A Part of Three (1989, Select Books) 
Leaving Home, Mother (1999, Angsana Books) 
The Best of Robert Yeo (2012, Epigram Books)

Novels
The Adventures of Holden Heng (1986, Heinemann Publishers Asia; 2011, Epigram Books)

Plays
Are You There, Singapore? (1974, National University of Singapore Society)
One Year Back Home (1980, National University of Singapore Society)
Second Chance (1988, 1992, TheatreWorks)
The Eye of History (1992)
Your Bed is Your Coffin (Unstaged)
Changi (1997, National University of Singapore Society)
The Singapore Trilogy (2001, Landmark Books)

Libretto
Kannagi–The Ankle Bracelet (2009, 2014)
Fences (2012)

Non-fiction
Routes: A Singaporean Memoir, 1940-75 (2011, Ethos Books)

Anthologies
 Gwee Li Sui, ed. Written Country: The History of Singapore through Literature (2016, Landmark Publications)

Personal life
Yeo is married to Esther Leong, who he met on the set of Are You There, Singapore? in 1974, when she played the character Hua after responding to an audition call in the newspapers.

References

Yeo Bibliography of critical writings about Yeo

 

1940 births
Living people
Recipients of the Bintang Bakti Masyarakat
Singaporean dramatists and playwrights
Singaporean novelists
Singaporean male writers
Singaporean people of Chinese descent
Singaporean poets
S.E.A. Write Award winners
Singaporean non-fiction writers
International Writing Program alumni
Male non-fiction writers
Fulbright alumni